Belenois aldabrensis is a butterfly in the  family Pieridae. It is found on the Seychelles.

References

Butterflies described in 1896
Pierini